Emilio Giletti (20 April 1929 – 4 January 2020) was an Italian racing driver. He made a name for himself in the early 1950s, after the racing experience took possession of the family factory, and was later the owner of Giletti S.p.A. His son Massimo Giletti is an Italian television host.

Racing career

Emilio Giletti only entered 25 races between 1951 and 1955, racing mainly Ferraris and Maseratis. In 1953, his big break came when Maserati decided to offer three young drivers the chance to drive their sportscars; Emilio was chosen along with Luigi Musso and Sergio Mantovani. It was with the Officine Alfieri Maserati squad, when he scored his biggest win, when he took a class victory on the 1953 Mille Miglia.

During this period, he enjoyed some success, scoring his only race win, in the 1952 non-championship Trofeo della Reggione Sardo and finished on the podium in the 1953 Targa Florio. Away from Sportscars, Giletti raced in just one Formula One race, the 1953 Gran Premio di Modena, but retired due to a valve failure with his Maserati A6GCM. He was also originally listed to race in the 1954 Gran Premio de la Republica Argentina, but Maserati gave the drive to Musso instead.

After finishing seventh in the 1955 Giro di Sicilia, he retired from International Motor Sport.

Giletti S.p.A.

Despite his passion for speed, he abandoned motorsport when he inherited the family business, Giletti S.p.A., one of the leading companies in the production of yarns. Under his control, the company became a technologically advanced company in the development of its production cycle, as well as their technical socks for sport.

In October 2012, Emilio Giletti was sentenced to nine months' imprisonment, suspended, for manslaughter following the death of a Giletti S.p.A. employee, Massimo Sasso, in September 2008.

Racing record

Career highlights

Complete Mille Miglia results

Complete 12 Ore di Pescara results

References

1929 births
2020 deaths
People from Trivero
Mille Miglia drivers
World Sportscar Championship drivers
Italian racing drivers
Sportspeople from the Province of Biella